Gilbert Hatfield (January 27, 1855 – May 27, 1921), nicknamed "Colonel", was an American professional baseball player who played third base and shortstop in the Major Leagues from 1885 to 1895. He was interred at Fairview Cemetery (Fairview, New Jersey).

External links

 

1855 births
1921 deaths
Major League Baseball second basemen
Major League Baseball shortstops
Baseball players from New Jersey
19th-century baseball players
Washington Statesmen players
New York Giants (NL) players
Buffalo Bisons (NL) players
Louisville Colonels players
Brooklyn Grooms players
New York Giants (PL) players
Sportspeople from Hoboken, New Jersey
Baltimore Monumentals (minor league) players
Harrisburg Olympics players
Newark Domestics players
Portland (minor league baseball) players
Seattle Hustlers players
Helena (minor league baseball) players
Charleston Seagulls players
Toledo White Stockings players
Kansas City Blues (baseball) players
Grand Rapids Bob-o-links players
Newark Colts players
New London Whalers players
Minor league baseball managers
Burials at Fairview Cemetery (Fairview, New Jersey)